Overseas Warriors is a franchise cricket team that represents Kotli in the Kashmir Premier League. Asad Shafiq was the captain and Azam Khan was the coach of the team. Asad Shafiq was announced as Overseas Warriors’ icon player.

Squad

Season standings

Points table

League fixtures and results

Playoffs

Eliminator 1

Eliminator 2

Statistics

Most runs 

Source: Cricinfo

Most wickets 

Source: Cricinfo

References

Kashmir Premier League (Pakistan)